Velčice is a village and municipality in Zlaté Moravce District of the Nitra Region, in western-central Slovakia.

History
In historical records the village was first mentioned in 1232.

Geography
In 2017 it had a population of 844 inhabitants.

References

External links
http://www.velcice.sk

Villages and municipalities in Zlaté Moravce District